The 22191 / 22192 Jabalpur–Indore Overnight Express  is a daily Superfast train of the Indian Railways, which runs between Jabalpur Junction railway station of Jabalpur, an important city & military cantonment hub of India, and Indore Junction, the main railway station in Indore, the commercial hub and largest city of the Central India in the state of Madhya Pradesh.

Coach composition

The train consists of 22 LHB coach :

 1 AC First Class
 2 AC II Tier
 4 AC III Tier
 9 Sleepar Class
 4 General Unreserved
 2 Seating cum Luggage Rake

Service

22191/Indore–Jabalpur Overnight Express has an average speed of 55 km/hr and covers 555 km in 10 hrs 10 mins.
22192/Jabalpur–Indore Overnight Express has an average speed of 55 km/hr and covers 555 km in 10 hrs 05 mins.

Route & halts

The important halts of the train are :

 
 
 
 
 
 
 Narmadapuram
 Rani Kamalapati

Schedule

Rake sharing

The train shares its rake with;
 11463/11464 Somnath–Jabalpur Express (via Itarsi),
 11465/11466 Somnath–Jabalpur Express (via Bina).

Direction reversal

The train reverses its direction once at;

 .

Traction

Both trains are hauled by an Itarsi Loco Shed-based WAP-4 or Tughlakabad Loco Shed-based WAP-7 electric locomotive from end to end.

References

Express trains in India
Rail transport in Madhya Pradesh
Transport in Indore
Transport in Jabalpur
Railway services introduced in 2011